Sheldrick Redwine (born November 6, 1996) is an American football safety for the Dallas Cowboys of the National Football League (NFL). He played college football at Miami (FL) and was drafted in 2019 by the Cleveland Browns.

Professional career

Cleveland Browns
Redwine was drafted by the Cleveland Browns in the fourth round (119th overall) of the 2019 NFL Draft. He signed his rookie contract with the Browns on May 2, 2019.

In Week 5 of the 2020 season against the Indianapolis Colts, Redwine recorded his first career interception off a pass thrown by Philip Rivers during the 32–23 win.

In the Wild Card round of the playoffs against the Pittsburgh Steelers, Redwine intercepted a pass thrown by Ben Roethlisberger during the 48–37 win.

Redwine was waived by the Browns on August 31, 2021.

New York Jets
On September 6, 2021, Redwine signed with the New York Jets. On September 21, 2021, he was waived by the Jets and re-signed to the practice squad. Redwine was released from the practice squad on October 12, 2021.

Carolina Panthers
On October 14, 2021, Redwine was signed to the Carolina Panthers practice squad.

Miami Dolphins
On October 26, 2021, Redwine was signed off the Panthers' practice squad by the Miami Dolphins. He was waived on November 16 and re-signed to the practice squad. He was promoted to the active roster on December 20. 

On March 21, 2022, Redwine re-signed with the Dolphins. He was waived on August 23, 2022.

Indianapolis Colts
On January 3, 2023, Redwine was signed to the Indianapolis Colts practice squad.

Dallas Cowboys
On January 19, 2023, Redwine was signed to the Dallas Cowboys practice squad. He signed a reserve/future contract on January 23, 2023.

References

External links
Cleveland Browns bio
Miami Hurricanes bio

1996 births
Living people
Players of American football from Miami
Miami Killian Senior High School alumni
American football safeties
American football cornerbacks
Miami Hurricanes football players
Cleveland Browns players
New York Jets players
Carolina Panthers players
Miami Dolphins players
Indianapolis Colts players
Dallas Cowboys players